Jalor railway station is an Indian railway station in Jalor district, Rajasthan. Its code is JOR. It serves Jalor city. The station consists of two platforms. Passenger, Express and Superfast trains halt here.

Trains

The following trains halt at Jalor railway station in both directions:

 Yesvantpur–Barmer AC Express
 Bhagat Ki Kothi–Ahmedabad Weekly Express
 Bikaner–Dadar Superfast Express
 Gandhidham–Jodhpur Express
 Bhagat Ki Kothi–Bandra Terminus Express (via Bhildi)

References

Railway stations in Jalor district
Jodhpur railway division